Korkeasaari Zoo, also known as Helsinki Zoo, is the largest zoo in Finland, located in Helsinki. The zoo was first opened in 1889. Today it is operated by a nonprofit foundation.

The zoo is among the most popular places among visitors in Helsinki. A ferry and water buses take visitors to the island of Korkeasaari, where the Zoo is located, during summertime from the Market Square. The zoo is also connected to the mainland via a bridge to the Helsinki district of Mustikkamaa, where there is access to the zoo all year round.

Conservation work 
Korkeasaari Zoo is a member of the European Association of Zoos and Aquaria (EAZA).

The zoo works with other modern zoos to maintain a healthy and viable zoo population with EAZA Ex-situ Programme and takes part in reintroduction programmes. Korkeasaari Zoo holds the European studbook for markhors, European forest reindeers and snowy owls and works as their conservation coordinator. 

The zoo is also a member of the International Union for Conservation of Nature. 

Korkeasaari Zoo holds fundraisings for many conservation projects, such as the Night of Cats for the Amur leopards and Amur tigers, and Lux Korkeasaari for snow leopards.

The zoo operates a Wildlife Hospital for injured and orphaned wild animals. It also runs a nature school for children.

Collection 
There are about 150 animal species in Korkeasaari Zoo, including mainly European or Asian species such as the Amur tiger, snow leopard, Przewalski's horse, Barbary macaque, snowy owl, bearded vulture and European otter. The collection has been selected so that outdoor animals can comfortably live in the climate of Finland: this means that many charismatic megafauna are absent. 

Korkeasaari Zoo has two tropical buildings, Amazonia and Africasia, which include tropical species of small mammals, amphibians, snakes, birds, fish and insects.

Gallery

References

External links 
 
 Helsinki zoo on zooinstitutes.com

1889 establishments in the Russian Empire
Zoos in Finland
Parks in Helsinki